Georges Groulx (June 26, 1922 – February 9, 1997) was a Canadian actor.

Biography
Groulx was born in Montreal, Quebec, Canada. He performed his classical studies at the college Cégep de Saint-Laurent, where he soon showed a strong interest in theater. He was noticed by Father Émile Legault, a theatrical animator who had founded in 1937 the pioneering company Compagnons de Saint-Laurent. In 1939, at the invitation of Father Legault and his sister Marguerite (first actress to join the cast), Groulx joined the company. Initially assigned to various tasks, such as scenic painter, he soon participated in religious plays that belonged to the company's repertory, such as La Mort à cheval (1941) by Henri Ghéon. In 1941, having finished his classical studies, he studied one year at the École du meuble de Montréal and 1942 at the Université de Montréal, where he graduated in 1943.

He died on February 9, 1997, in Montreal.

Partial filmography
14, rue de Galais - 1954
Opération-mystère - 1957
Le Courrier du roy - 1958
Les Enquêtes Jobidon - 1962
Le Temps des lilas - 1962
Les Martin - 1968
Two Women in Gold (Deux femmes en or) - 1970
Au retour des oies blanches - 1971
Duplessis - 1977

References

1997 deaths
1922 births
Canadian male television actors
Canadian male film actors
Male actors from Montreal
20th-century Canadian male actors
Canadian male stage actors